= Lala Jaswantrai Churamani =

Indian politician

- Born: 25 March 1882; Ludhiana, Punjab, India
- Died: 6 November 1972 (aged 90)
- Organization(s): Indian National Congress, Arya Samaj
- Movement: Indian Independence movement

Lala Jaswantrai Churamani (born 25 March 1882) also known as Lala Jaswant Rai, was an activist in the Indian independence movement.
